The UralZIS-355M is a truck that was produced by Ural from 1957 or 1958 to 1965. The truck replaced several versions of the ZIS-5 that were produced by the manufacturer after World War II. It was replaced because the Ural-plant specialized in the production of heavy all-wheel-drive trucks like the Ural-375. From 1961 to 1965 the truck was named Ural-355M due to De-Stalinization.

History 

The UralZIS plant in Miass was founded during the Second World War when the production of the ZIS plant in Moscow was relocated behind the Ural to be protected against attacks by the Germans. Mainly ZIS-5 trucks were built. However, the plant in Moscow was able to resume production a short time later. The production facility in Miass remained and was henceforth called UralZIS. The UralZIS-5 called trucks were produced here with minor technical changes until 1958. In the mid-1950s, the vehicles were renamed again to UralZIS-355 in accordance with the standardized numbering system for Soviet vehicles. It was not until the end of 1957 or the beginning of 1958 that major changes were made to the bodywork and the technology of the trucks and transferred to series production. The new vehicle was named UralZIS-355M, where the M stands for "modernized".

The UralZIS-355M was built in series until 1965. In 1961 the name was changed to Ural-355M to accommodate de-Stalinization. During the production time there were only minor technical changes. About 192,500 copies of the truck were built before production ceased. In the course of the increasing specialization of the Soviet auto industry, medium-weight trucks were primarily built in Zavod imeni Likhachyova in Moscow. The factory had previously built similar trucks like the ZIS-150 or the ZIL-164 in large numbers. Despite the large number of UralZIS-355Ms built, the truck is rare today. There are still a little over 20 copies known on the territory of the former Soviet Union.

The UralAZ plant (previously UralZIS), which was also renamed at the beginning of the 1960s, no longer built light trucks after production of the Ural-355M was discontinued. It specialized completely in the construction of all-terrain three-axle vehicles such as the Ural-375 and the Ural-4320, which is still in production today.

Technical data 
All data apply for the flatbed truck UralZIS-355M.
 engine: in-line six-cylinder four-stroke petrol engine
 engine type: УралЗИС-353А
 power: 70 kW
 displacement: 5550 cm³
 maximum torque: 31.5 kpm (309 Nm)
 compression: 6:1
 tank capacity: 110 L
 fuel consumption: between 24 and 45 L/100 km, strongly dependent on the road surface and speed
 layout: 4×2

Dimensions and weights
 length: 6290 mm
 width: 2280 mm
 height: 2080 mm
 wheelbase: 3824 mm
 front track: 1611 mm
 rear track: 1675 mm
 ground clearance: 262 mm
 turning circle: 16.6 m
 tire size: 8.25-20"
 payload: 3500 kg
 empty weight: 3360 kg
 permissible total weight: 7050 kg

References

Further reading 
 Andy Thompson: Trucks of the Soviet Union: The Definitive History. Behemoth Publishing, Wincanton 2017, .
 L. M. Schugurov: АВТОМОБИЛИ России и СССР. First book. Ilbi/Prostreks, Moscow 1993, .
 Ministry of Automobile Transport of the RSFSR; Vehicle construction institute NIIAT: краткий автомобильный справочник. Publishing Transport, 5. edition, Moscow 1965.
 P. A. Fishbeyn, D. S. Blyachman: Owners Manual for ZIS-5, UralZIS-355, UralZIS-355V and UralZIS-355M. Avtotransizdat publishing, Moscow 1961.

Trucks of the Soviet Union
Ural Automotive Plant trucks